Jagdalpur is a city in Bastar district in the Indian state of Chhattisgarh. Jagdalpur is the administrative headquarters of Bastar District and Bastar Division. It was earlier the capital of the former princely state of Bastar. It is the fourth largest city of Chhattisgarh.The city is one of the most important commercial, financial and political hub in Chhattisgarh.

Climate
Jagdalpur has a tropical savanna climate (Köppen climate classification Aw) with three main seasons: summer, monsoon, and winter. Summers last from March to May and are hot, with the average maximum for May reaching . The weather cools off somewhat for the monsoon season from June to September, which features very heavy rainfall. Winters are warm and dry.

Demographics

 year 2021,town has a population of 114,345. The Municipal Corporation have a sex ratio of 985 females per 1,000 males and 19.0% of the population were under six years old.  Effective literacy was 90.44%; male literacy was 92.51% and female literacy was 88.37%.

At the time of the 2011 census, 81.80% of the population were Hindus, 9.44% Christians, 5.32% Muslims, 1.81% Jains, 1.27% Sikhs.

Hindi is the largest language, spoken by 54% of the population.

Industry and economy
Jagdalpur has a primarily agrarian economy, it is the second biggest market after Raipur in state, although it also has many small scale and a few large scale industries as well. Furniture Industries and rice mills are the most common industries in this region. Nagarnar Steel Plant, being set up at its outskirts, is at an advanced construction and is slated for commissioning in October 2018.

Nagarnar Steel Plant

National Mineral Development Corporation (NMDC), as part of its diversification, value addition and forward integration programme is setting up a 3 MTPA capacity greenfield Integrated Steel Plant based on HiSmelt technology in Nagarnar, located 16 km from Jagdalpur in Chhattisgarh state with an estimated outlay of Rs 20000 crore.

Construction work for the project is in progress and around 90.59% of civil work, 79.01% structural erection, 60.36% equipment erection have been completed as on
31 December 17.

Baijendra Kumar, Chairman cum managing director, NMDC has set October 2018 as the deadline to commission the plant.

Places of Interest
The contribution of Tourism in the Economy of Jagdalpur Tourism is one of the main sources of income for the city. The city is rightly said to be the paradise of tourists looking for fun and frolic in Jagdalpur. The city is an abode of many wildlife, temples, waterfalls, caves, lakes, museums, historic monuments and what not.  Some of the must-visit places in Jagdalpur are Chitrakote Falls, Teerathgarh Falls, Kotumsar Cave, Tamda Ghumar waterfalls, Mendri Ghumar waterfalls, Kanger Ghati National Park, Indravati National Park, Danteshwari Temple, the historic Temples in Barsoor, Jagannath temple, Mavli temple, Laxmi-Narayan temple, The Sri Venkateshwara Swamy Temple and more.

The Ministry of Tourism, Government of India has identified Jagdalpur-Teerathgarh-Chitrakoot-Barsur-Dantewada-Teerathgarh Circuit as one of the 45 Mega Tourist Destinations/Circuits in India on the basis of footfalls and their future tourism potential.

Transport

Road Transport
Road network in and around Jagdalpur can be seen from the road network map of the area.

The National Highways passing through Jagdalpur are NH 30 (connecting Raipur to Vijaywada in Andhra Pradesh via NH 65), and NH 63 (connecting Jagdalpur to Nizamabad in Telangana) while passing through Maharashtra.

NH 30 at Raipur connects Jagdalpur to Asian Highway 46 leading to Nagpur and Kolkata.
NH 30 near Vijayawada connects Jagdalpur to NH 65 leading to Hyderabad and Pune.

Rail Transport
Jagdalpur is connected by rail line with the eastern part of India. There are trains connecting Jagdalpur to Howrah, Bhubaneshwar and Visakhapatnam. The rail connectivity of Jagdalpur to Durg via Rayagada and Raipur is about 658 km long and takes 14.5 hours of travel time as compared to that by road which takes about 6–7 hours (distance 300 km).

Jagdalpur-Rowghat Rail Line Status

NMDC, IRCON, SAIL and CMDC have signed an agreement on 20 January 2016 and pursuant to the same, a company named Bastar Railway Private Limited (BRPL) has already been formed on 5 May 2016  for undertaking implementation of the railway line from Jagdalpur to Rowghat.

NDMC has the biggest shareholding in BRPL at 43 percent while SAIL, IRCON & Govt. of Chhattisgarh have shareholding of 21 percent, 26 percent and 10 percent respectively.

BRPL and IRCON have signed a project execution agreement in July 2017, under which IRCON will construct the railway line between Jagdalpur and Rawghat in Chhattisgarh. The railway line will have 13 new Railway stations and the estimated project cost of this Rail corridor is Rs 2,538 crore approximately.

Presently, the Detailed Project Report (DPR) for this section of the rail line has already been sanctioned by the Railways Board.

Survey work is currently underway and the target was earlier set to complete survey work of Jagdalpur-Kondagaon-Narayanpur by the month of March 2016 and of Narayanpur-Rowghat section by the month of May 2016, but there have been delays reported. In a government review carried out in February 2018, it was reported that the survey work for Jagdalpur to Kondagaon railway track laying comprising length of 91.76 km had been completed for Jagdalpur-Rowghat Railway project. It was also reported that the survey work for Kondagaon to Rowghat for the 91.6 km to 140 km distance in under progress. The project team was directed by government to complete all the survey work for the project by 15 March 2018.

Air Transport
In the name of Maa Danteshwari Airport, Jagdalpur has started daily flight services between Jagdalpur, Raipur, Hyderabad by Alliance Air under the Regional Connectivity Scheme (RCS) – UDAN (Ude Desh Ka Aam Nagrik) of Government of India. Jagdalpur Airport is spread over an area of 132 acres.

and last year for paramilitary force Indigo airlines started 72 seater ATR from Jagdalpur to Delhi via Raipur.

See also

References

External links

Bastar District Website
Official Website Govt. of Chhattisgarh

 
Cities and towns in Bastar district